Inside the Walls of Folsom Prison is a 1951 American film noir crime film directed by Crane Wilbur and starring Steve Cochran and David Brian. Set in Folsom State Prison in California, the film was seen both in the United States and Europe.

Country singer Johnny Cash saw this movie while serving in the United States Air Force in West Germany in October 1951, and used it as an inspiration for his hit song "Folsom Prison Blues," which he recorded numerous times between 1955 and his death in 2003.

The film was featured in the 2005 biographical film Walk the Line, in which Cash (played by Joaquin Phoenix) and other Air Force personnel are depicted seeing the film.

Plot summary
During the 1920s, before the 1944 California prison reform, Warden Ben Rickey (Ted De Corsia) rules Folsom Prison with a ruthless hand. He believes that prisons should be used for punishment, rather than rehabilitation to reduce the incidence of repeated returns to jail (recidivism). His methods are violent, torturous, and intended to beat the prisoners into submission.

Chuck Daniels (Steve Cochran), one of the toughest inmates, and his group of followers are intent on escaping. However, after an attempt which is thwarted by Rickey, a riot ensues resulting in the deaths of two officers and a few prisoners. Rickey, with his iron fist, doles out severe and cruel punishments to all prisoners connected to the incident.

In response to increasing violence, and the warden's inhumane treatment, the prison's board of directors hire an assistant, Mark Benson (David Brian), as captain of the guards. He believes that the inmates, despite their serious crimes, deserve to be treated better and given an opportunity to change by being educated on how to live on the outside, prior to release, in order to increase their chances of becoming productive members of society. Benson makes many changes to the regimen including serving meat, allowing inmates to talk during meal times, and promoting rehabilitation programs such as employment help. He  also changes the way the guards do their jobs as well, by expecting them to come to work clean, behave in a professional way, and discontinue the senseless beatings that cause trouble.

These changes go against the wishes of the warden and Benson eventually leaves his post as captain of the guards. With Benson gone, Warden Rickey reverts all of the reforms and the inmates retaliate with yet another escape attempt. A riot erupts in which many are fatally wounded.

Cast

 Steve Cochran as Chuck Daniels
 David Brian as Mark Benson
 Philip Carey as Red Pardue
 Ted de Corsia as Warden Ben Rickey (as Ted De Corsia)
 Scott Forbes as Jim Frazier
 Michael Tolan as Leo Daly (as Lawrence Tolan)
 Dick Wesson as Tinker
 Paul Picerni as Jeff Riordan
 William Campbell as Nick Ferretti
 Edward Norris as Sgt. Cliff Hart (as Eddie Norris)

References

External links
 
 
 

1951 films
1951 crime drama films
1950s prison films
Film noir
American black-and-white films
American crime drama films
American prison drama films
Films directed by Crane Wilbur
Films scored by William Lava
Films set in California
Films set in the 1920s
Warner Bros. films
1950s English-language films
1950s American films